A Thousand Suns is a 2010 studio album by American rock band Linkin Park. A Thousand Suns may also refer to:

A verse from the Bhagavad Gita (XI,12), quoted by physicist J. Robert Oppenheimer in describing the atomic bomb
A Thousand Suns World Tour, Linkin Park tour in support of the album
A Thousand Suns (Russell Morris album), 1991 Russell Morris album
"A Thousands Suns", a television episode from season 10 of Criminal Minds
"A Thousand Suns", 2004 book by yoga author Linda Johnsen

See also
A Thousand Sons, 2010 installment of the Warhammer 40,000 science fantasy series The Horus Heresy
A Thousand Splendid Suns, 2007 novel by Afghan-American author Khaled Hosseini
A Thousand Splendid Suns (opera), with music by American composer Sheila Silver, based on the novel
The Meeting of a Thousand Suns, 2010 Linkin Park DVD
City of a Thousand Suns, 1965 science fantasy novel by Samuel R. Delany
In the Shadow of a Thousand Suns, 2008 album by American black metal band Abigail Williams
Fire of a Thousand Suns, 1995 book by Hiroshima atomic bombing crew member George R. Caron
Brighter than a Thousand Suns (disambiguation)